Steven Lee is a multi-platinum hit Korean-American music producer, songwriter, and multi-instrumentalist. He studied music & theory in California State University, Los Angeles, and began a career in music songwriting and production after he won "Star Search" as a music producer at Studio56. He was also recognized as USA Songwriting Competition finalist in the dance music category in 2004. His latest producing/songwriting work includes "The Avengers: Age of Ultron" Movie's international image song "In Memories", and has produced & written for many Asia's top artists such as; Arashi, KAT-TUN, Namie Amuro, TVXQ, Exo, Hey! Say! Jump, Kis-My-Ft2, BoA, SS501, Super Junior, Shinee, Girls' Generation, V6, Sexy Zone, Kim Hyun Joong, Yamashita Tomohisa, Wheesung, B1A4, FTIsland, Nakayama Yuma, E-Girls, Da-iCE, Got7, ABC-Z, Johnnys WEST, and internationally successful acts including US5, Ian Thomas, Lena Katina (t.A.T.u), After Romeo, The United, Varsity Fanclub & many more. He also composed "Secret Garden", "Remember Me", and "Nonstop" for Oh My Girl

Selected awards and certifications 
2005 The Japan Gold Disc Award - "Summary of Johnny's World Music DVD" - Gold
2005 The Japan Gold Disc Award - "Kaizokuban Music DVD" - Platinum
2006 The Japan Gold Disc Award - "Kaizokuban Music DVD" - Best Music DVD of the Year
2006 The Japan Gold Disc Award - "Best of KAT-TUN" - Triple Platinum
2006 The Japan Gold Disc Award - "Best of KAT-TUN" - Best 10 Albums of the Year
2006 The Japan Gold Disc Award - "V6-Good Day!" - Gold
2007 The Japan Gold Disc Award - "Real Face Live DVD" - Platinum
2007 The Japan Gold Disc Award - "Real Face Live DVD" - Best Music DVD of the Year
2007 The Japan Gold Disc Award - "Ultra Music Power" - Platinum
2007 The Japan Gold Disc Award - "Ultra Music Power" - Best 10 Singles of the Year
2008 The Japan Gold Disc Award - Hey! Say! JUMP Debut & First Concert Ikinari! in Tokyo Dome (2008)DVD" - Gold
2008 The Japan Gold Disc Award - "KAT-TUN III - Queens of Pirates" - Platinum
2009 The Japan Gold Disc Award - "KAT-TUN Live Tour 2008 Queen of Pirates DVD" - Gold
2009 The Japan Gold Disc Award - "Break the Records - by you & for you-" - Platinum
2009 KBS TV Music Bank Korea - "Love Like This" K-Chart No.1 - 2 Weeks (09.11.13)
2009 SBS TV Inkigayo Korea - "Love LIke This" - No.1 "Mutizen Song"  (09.11.22)
2009 The Japan Gold Disc Award - "Hey! Say! Jump-ing Tour '08-'09 DVD" - Gold (2X)
2009 The Japan Gold Disc Award - "KAT-TUN Live Break the Records DVD" - Gold
2010 KBS TV Musicbank Korea - "Love Ya" Song No.1 Single of the Week "Mutizen Song" (10.06.11)
2010 The Japan Gold Disc Award - "No More Pain" - Gold (2X)
2010 The Japan Gold Disc Award - "Jump NO.1" - Gold (2X)
2010 The Japan Gold Disc Award - ｢ありがとう｣～世界のどこにいても～ - Gold
2011 The Japan Gold Disc Award - "KAT-TUN -NO MORE PAIИ- WORLD TOUR 2010 DVD" - Gold (4X)
2011 The Japan Gold Disc Award - "SUMMARY 2010 DVD" - Gold (2X)
2011 M-Net M Countdown Korea - "Break Down" K-Chart No.1 - 2weeks (11.06.13)
2011 KBS TV Music Bank Korea - "Break Down" No,1 Single of the Week - 2 Weeks (11.06.17)
2011 The Japan Gold Disc Award - "KIS-MY-FT2 - The 1st Single - Everybody Go" - Platinum (2X)
2011 KBS TV Music Bank Korea - "Lucky Guy" Music Bank - No,1 Single of the Week (11.10.21)
2011 The Japan Gold Disc Award - "KIS-MY-FT2 - Everybody Go at 横浜アリーナ DVD" - Gold (3X)
2011 The Japan Gold Disc Award - "Kis-My-Ftに逢えるde Show vol.3 at 国立代々木競技場第一体育館" - Gold
2012 The Japan Gold Disc Award - Shinee - "The First" - Gold
2012 The Japan Gold Disc Award - Kim Hyun Joong "Kiss Kiss / Lucky Guy" - Gold (4X)
2012 The Japan Gold Disc Award - "KIS-MY-FT2 - The 1st Album - Kis-My-1st" - Platinum (3X)
2012 The Japan Gold Disc Award - "Hey! Say! Jump" - 2nd Album "Jump World" - Gold
2012 The Japan Gold Disc Award - "KIS-MY-FT2 - DVD - Kis-My-Mint" - Gold (6X)
2012 The Japan Gold Disc Award - Kim Hyun Joong "Heat" - Gold (2X)
2013 The Japan Gold Disc Award - Sexy Zone 1st Album "one SEXY Zone" - Gold (3X)
2013 The Japan Gold Disc Award - Kim Hyun Joong "Unlimited" - Gold (9X)
2013 The Japan Gold Disc Award - "KIS-MY-FT2 - The 2nd Album - Goodいくぜ!" - Platinum (2X)
2013 The Japan Gold Disc Award - Kim Hyun Joong 3rd Single "Tonight" - Gold
2013 The Japan Gold Disc Award - "Hey! Say! Jump" - "10th Single" - Platinum
2013 The Japan Gold Disc Award - Amuro Namie "Feel" - Platinum
2013 The Japan Gold Disc Award - KAT-TUN "1st Mini Album" - Gold (3X)
2013 The Japan Gold Disc Award - Shinee - "Boys Meet U" - Gold
2014 The Japan Gold Disc Award - Girls' Generation "Love & Peace" - Gold
2014 The Japan Gold Disc Award - KIS-MY-FT2 "Snow Dome no yakusoku DVD" - Gold (4X)
2014 The Japan Gold Disc Award - Sexy Zone - 2nd Album "Sexy Second" - Gold
2014 The Japan Gold Disc Award - TVXQ - "Tree" - Platinum (2X)
2014 The Japan Gold Disc Award - Amuro Namie - DVD "Feel Tour" - Gold (2X)
2014 The Japan Gold Disc Award - KAT-TUN - "come Here" - Gold
2014 The Japan Gold Disc Award - Girls' Generation "The Best" - Gold
2014 The Japan Gold Disc Award - TVXQ - "2014 Tree Tour DVD/Blu-ray" - Gold (3X)
2014 The Japan Gold Disc Award - Johnnys West - "ジパング・おおきに大作戦/夢を抱きしめて" - Gold
2014 The Japan Gold Disc Award - Sexy Zone - "男 never give up" - Gold
2014 The Japan Gold Disc Award - Arashi - "The Digitalian" - Triple Platinum

Original songs (released)

Selected discography (CDs, DVDs, performances and TV shows)

Produced Albums (Album Producer)
 SS501 Mini Album "Rebirth" - #1 Single ("Love Like This") & Album in Korea, Platinum in Taiwan
 SS501 Mini Album "De5tination" - #1 Single ("Love Ya") & Album in Korea, Platinum in Taiwan
 Kim Hyun Joong Mini Album "Break Down" -  #1 Single ("Break Down") & Album in Korea, Platinum in Taiwan
 Kim Hyun Joong Mini Album "Lucky" - #1 Single ("Lucky Guy") & Album in Korea, Platinum in Taiwan
 Kim Hyun Joong Digital Single "Please"
 Kim Hyun Joong Digital Single "Marry Me"
 A-Jax Digital Single "One 4 U"
 A-Jax Digital Single "Hot Game"
 A-Jax Mini Album "2MYX"
 Kim Hyun Joong 1st Japanese Single Kiss Kiss/Lucky Guy - #2 Japan, Gold Certified
 Kim Hyun Joong 2nd Japanese Single Heat - #1 Japan, Gold Certified
 Kim Hyun Joong 1st Japanese Album "Unlimited" - #1 Japan, Gold Certified
 Heo Young Saeng 1st Mini Album "Let It Go" - #2 Album Korea
 Heo Young Saeng 2nd Mini Album "Solo" - Top 10 Album Korea
 Kim Hyun Joong 1st Live DVD/Blu-ray "1st Impact" - #1 DVD Japan
 Kim Hyun Joong 3rd Japanese Single "Tonight" - #2 Japan, Gold Certified
 Kim Hyun Joong Mini Album "Round 3" - #1 Album Korea, #1 Billboards World Album Chart
 Kim Hyun Joong 2nd Live DVD/Blu-ray "Tonight Premium Live"
 Kim Hyun Joong Mini Album "Timing" - #1 Album Korea

References

External links 
Official Website
Official Myspace

Record producers from California
American musicians of Korean descent
1983 births
Living people